Wolf's Lair is a 2017 Indian military geopolitical thriller written by Mayank Singh. The book was distributed among all the 3000 military libraries across the country after passing the Indian Army review process. The novel is set in the backdrop of the hybrid war going on India; "indoctrination of gullible youngsters, the Pakistani Deep State and how it bleeds India with a thousand cuts and counter-terrorism operations" are some the elements that make up the fictional story based on reality.

References 

2017 Indian novels
Books by Indian authors